SS Wairuna, originally called D/S Schneefels, then SS Gibraltar and SS Polescar, was a cargo steamship that was launched in Germany in 1913. She had a varied career spanning three decades under successive German, British and New Zealand owners before being scuttled in the North Atlantic in 1945.

Building
The ship was built by Flensburger Schiffbau-Gesellschaft of Flensburg, Schleswig-Holstein. She was launched on 13 November 1913 and completed on 1 January 1914.

The ship was launched as D/S Schneefels for the Deutsche Dampfschiffahrts-Gesellschaft Hansa (DDG Hansa). D/S stands for Dampfschiff, just as "SS" stands for "Steamship" in English. DDG Hansa gave many of its ships names ending in -fels ("rock"), (e.g. D/S Freienfels, D/S Uhenfels, D/S Wachtfels), so that collectively they became known as the "Fels ships".

First World War
On 5 August 1914, a week after the outbreak of the First World War, Schneefels was in the Mediterranean a mile off Europa Point when the Royal Navy captured her and took her to Gibraltar. She was judged to be a prize ship and was renamed Gibraltar. She was posted to Moudros in the Aegean Sea where she served as a store ship until 1915. From then until 1916 she served as a water carrier in the eastern Mediterranean.

In August 1916 the ship was returned to general cargo duties. She remained in UK Government ownership but was placed under the management of Houlder, Middleton and Company and renamed Polescar. In 1917 her management was transferred to G Heyn and Sons of Belfast. On 14 March 1917 she was northwest of Ireland when an enemy submarine on the surface chased her, but she outran it. On 25 September 1917 she was unloading at Dunkirk, France when she was caught in an air raid. A German bomb hit her and killed two people. On 5 August 1918 she was in the English Channel en route from Montreal to Le Havre.

Between the wars
The British-India Steam Navigation Company bought her in January 1919 but sold her the next month for £146,000 to the Union Steam Ship Company of New Zealand.
The Union Line renamed her Wairuna, which had been the name of a cargo ship sunk by the German auxiliary cruiser  in 1917.

In 1921 the Union Company had her converted to carry oil cargo in her double bottoms. She had radioed distress messages and was rescued by another Union Company ship, the Waihemo.

On 4 February 1933, a day after leaving Newcastle, New South Wales, Wairuna lost a blade from her propeller. She completed her voyage to Auckland on its remaining blades. On 2 March 1936 she collided with Glasgow Wharf at Napier, New Zealand. Wharf piles were damaged but the ship was unharmed. On 8 February 1937 she was in San Francisco when fire broke out in her cargo of copra. The ship was extensively damaged, with some buckling of her plates.

Second World War and after
During the Second World War Wairuna continued in merchant service in the Pacific. In 1945 the Union Company sold her to the UK MoWT. The MoWT appointed J&J Denholm to manage her, and she served as a store ship on the River Clyde. On 5 August 1945 she was at Greenock when a fire destroyed much of her upperworks.

In October 1945 Wairunas hulk was loaded with 8,432 tons of unused chemical ammunition and on 30 October she was scuttled in the North Atlantic beyond the continental shelf, 120 nautical miles (138 miles; 222 km) northwest of Ireland.

Wairuna was one of four redundant cargo ships that the Admiralty used to dispose of chemical ammunition in the same area of the North Atlantic in 1945.

Relic
The ship's bell has been preserved. It is cast brass and bears her original name Schneefels.

References

External links
 — includes photographs of the ship as Wairuna, and of her preserved bell bearing her original name Schneefels
 — includes another photograph of the ship as Wairuna

1913 ships
Maritime incidents in October 1945
Prize warfare
Scuttled vessels of the United Kingdom
Ships of the Union Steam Ship Company
Steamships of Germany
Steamships of New Zealand
Steamships of the United Kingdom
World War II shipwrecks in the Atlantic Ocean
World War I merchant ships of Germany